Sheila Lea ( Maclagan; 16 March 1901–1992) was a British sculptor.

Biography
Lea was born in London to a Scottish father, Norman Maclagan, and his wife, Olive, who was from Cornwall. Lea spent part of her childhood at Bruton in Somerset before attending the Bournemouth College of Art where she was taught by the sculptor Joseph Hermon Cawthra. After moving to London to study at the Regent Street Polytechnic School of Art, Lea returned to Bournemouth where she lived for the rest of her life. From there she produced statuettes and sculpture groups in both bronze and plaster and was particularly noted for her portrait work.  From 1946 to 1983 Lea was a regular exhibitor at Royal Academy group shows in London. She also had pieces shown at the Paris Salon, with the Society of Women Artists and with the Bournemouth Arts' Club of which she was a member. The Russell-Cotes Art Gallery & Museum has examples of her work.

References

1901 births
1992 deaths
20th-century British sculptors
20th-century English women artists
Alumni of Arts University Bournemouth
Alumni of the Regent Street Polytechnic
English women sculptors 
Sculptors from London